Invasion of Italy may refer to:

 The Lombard invasion of Italy, from 568
 The Allied invasion of Italy, 3–17 September 1943
 The German invasion of Italy, Operation Achse, 8–19 September 1943